Jacco Eltingh and Paul Haarhuis were the defending champions, but did not participate together this year.  Eltingh partnered Sjeng Schalken, losing in the quarterfinals. Haarhuis did not participate this year.

Mahesh Bhupathi and Leander Paes won in the final 6–4, 3–6, 6–4, against Olivier Delaître and Fabrice Santoro.

Seeds
Champion seeds are indicated in bold text while text in italics indicates the round in which those seeds were eliminated.

Draw

Finals

References

External links
Draw

1998 Qatar Open
1998 ATP Tour